Eunidia brunneovittipennis is a species of beetle in the family Cerambycidae. It was described by Stephan von Breuning in 1954.

References

Eunidiini
Beetles described in 1954